Wakeful Eyes (Egyptian Arabic: عيون سهرانة, translit: Uyoon Sahranah, aliases: Sleepless Night) is a 1956 Egyptian romantic drama directed by Ezz El-Dine Zulficar. The film stars Salah Zulfikar and Shadia. The film is Salah Zulfikar's film debut.

Plot 
A good man "Saber Effendi" hardly settled for months in one house with his daughter Fatima.  He claims to her that he works in a newspaper printing press, hates mixing with people, and takes pity on her from temptation.  In the new residence, "Fatma" contacts the neighbor's son; “Salah” (Salah Zulfikar) who is a student in the last year of the Police College, and they are bound by love, so he goes to marry her from her father, where he works in the newspaper. The daughter discovers that her father does not work in that newspaper. She returns home and tells him about her discovery, and he confesses to her that he was a secretary to the prosecution.  And he had another older daughter, who committed suicide to get rid of shame, and confessed to him while she was dying in the name of the one who seduced her and deserted her. The man is afraid that he will be arrested, so he runs away with his other child, and comes to Cairo, where he changes his name.

Primary cast 

 Salah Zulfikar as Salah
 Shadia as Fatma
 Ferdoos Mohammed as Salah's mother
 Aqeela Rateb as Ragaa
 Abdul Warith Aser as Saber Effendi
 Fouad El-Mohandes as Salah's friend
 Abdel Rehim El Zorqani as the lawyer

References

External links 

 
 Wakeful Eyes on elCinema

1956 films
1950s Arabic-language films
20th-century Egyptian films
Egyptian black-and-white films
Egyptian romantic drama films
Films shot in Egypt
1956 romantic drama films
Films directed by Ezz El-Dine Zulficar